Kenneth Connolly (born 4 April 1987) is a Scottish footballer, who plays for Kirkintilloch Rob Roy in the Scottish Junior Football Association, West Region. He has previously played in the Scottish Premier League for Motherwell.

Career
Connolly started his career with Motherwell and made his first team debut in a Scottish Cup tie against Airdrie United on 6 January 2007. He appeared twice in the Scottish Premier League for the club against Dundee United in March and May 2007. A broken leg set Connolly's career back and despite winning a contract extension in the summer of 2008, the player was released in the January 2009 transfer window.

Connolly joined Ayr United from Motherwell on loan on 16 January 2009 and made his debut the following day in a league match away to Stirling Albion. He signed a permanent contract for the club during the summer of 2009.

On his release from Ayr in the summer of 2010, Connolly had a trial period with Clyde but was not offered a contract.

Connolly signed for Junior side Auchinleck Talbot in October 2010 and was part of their 2010–11 Scottish Junior Cup winning team at the end of that season. He moved on to Kirkintilloch Rob Roy in February 2012.

References

External links

Profile at Ayr United F.C. official website

1987 births
Footballers from Glasgow
Living people
Scottish footballers
Association football midfielders
Motherwell F.C. players
Ayr United F.C. players
Clyde F.C. players
Auchinleck Talbot F.C. players
Kirkintilloch Rob Roy F.C. players
Scottish Premier League players
Scottish Football League players
Scottish Junior Football Association players